Bicalicene is polycyclic hydrocarbon with chemical formula C16H8, composed of two cyclopentadiene and two cyclopropene rings linked into a larger eight-membered ring.  There are two isomers:  cis-bicalicene  and trans-bicalicene.  It is a dimer of calicene.

Synthesis 
Bicalicene is prepared by treatment of 1,2-bis(tert-butylthio)-3,3-dichlorocyclopropene with cyclopentadiene anion, followed by desulfurizing stannylation with tributyltin hydride, and then treatment with silica gel.

Properties 

trans-Bicalicene is polycyclic aromatic hydrocarbon, which is unusual for a 16 π electron ring system. Viewed as a unified ring structure, Hückel's rule predicts it would be anti-aromatic (4n π electrons). Instead, however, the structure has a dominant partially-delocalized charge-separated structure consisting of four independently-aromatic (4n+2 π electron) rings: two as cyclopropenyl cations (two π electrons each) and two as cyclopentadienyl anions (six π electrons each).

cis-Bicalicene, by contrast, is an antiaromatic hydrocarbon. A resonance structure with four aromatic rings, analogous to the one that makes the trans isomer stable, would suffer from destabilizing charge effects, and other resonance structures have 4n rather than 4n+2 π electrons in at least one ring.

References

Polycyclic aromatic hydrocarbons
Cyclopropenes
Non-benzenoid aromatic carbocycles
Antiaromatic compounds
B